Lazy Ballerina is a term used in viticulture. It refers to the trellis that a wine grapevine is grown on.  This is a common trellis in Australian wine production particularly in the McLaren Vale wine region of South Australia.

References 
Viticulture